Alfred Westland Nixon (June 8, 1863 – April 8, 1921) was an Ontario physician and political figure. He represented Halton in the Legislative Assembly of Ontario from 1905 to 1919 as a Conservative member.

He was born in Stewarttown, Halton County, Canada West, the son of Edward Nixon, and educated in Brampton and at Trinity College. He received his M.D. in 1891 and set up practice in Georgetown. In 1903, he married Bessie Barber. Nixon served as reeve of Georgetown from 1901 to 1902. He was defeated by John Roaf Barber when he ran for a seat in the provincial assembly in 1902. He died in Guelph in 1921.

References 

 Canadian Parliamentary Guide, 1914, E.J. Chambers

External links 

The Georgetown Herald,  December 17, 1913

1863 births
1921 deaths
Physicians from Ontario
Progressive Conservative Party of Ontario MPPs
Trinity College (Canada) alumni